The United States Semiquincentennial Commission is the Congressionally-appointed body in charge of promoting and coordinating the United States Semiquincentennial. The commission has been chaired by Rosie Rios since July 2022.

Formation 

The Commissioners, whom are designated by the party leaders of the United States Senate and the House, count a total of eight from Congress, of which, two from each chamber will be designated by their party leader, respectively. In addition, the law provides for the appointment of private citizens, defined as those who are neither employees nor offices of any federal or state or local government. These are appointed by the aforementioned party leadership, with each leader naming four, for a total of sixteen. Among these sixteen, the President of the United States designates a chairperson.

On November 16, 2018, the then-33 members, of the Commission, who are referred to as Commissioners, were sworn in at Independence Hall in Philadelphia, which was chosen by Congress "to honor the historical significance of the building as the site of deliberations and adoption of both the United States Declaration of Independence and Constitution," and convened their first organizing meeting to begin eight years of planning and organizing for the 250th national birthday celebration. Chairman DiLella, designated as such by then-President Donald Trump, estimated that the group would meet three or four times a year. The new commission originally consisted of 16 private citizens, including chairman DiLella, eight members of Congress and nine federal officials. However, in 2020, the organic law was amended to increase the number of non voting ex officio federal officials to a total of 12, including a member designated by the Chief Justice of the United States, increasing the overall body's membership to 36.

All Commission work, which consists of "inclusion — geographic, demographic — [as] a core theme," shall cease by its termination, on December 31, 2027.

As determined by its organic law, the United States Secretary of the Interior held a competitive application process to select "the nonprofit partner that [would] serve as Administrative Secretariat for the...Commission." On May 4, 2018, the then-Civil War Trust, now known as the American Battlefield Trust, was chosen. The Administrative Secretariat's responsibilities include housing the Commission, raising funds for it and preparing reports to Congress on behalf of the Commission. Additionally, the Commission works in tandem with the America250 Foundation, "its private, nonprofit partner," which was founded in 2019 by the Commission and Trust themselves, and is "the primary service provider to the [Commission]," under a Master Service Agreement enacted in May 2020. The Commission and Foundation both "share a website" and work and identify themselves under America250 banner, in addition to having the DiLella as chairman in both organizations. In addition, the Commission helped create a Congressional caucus, the Congressional America250 Caucus to act as a liaison between Commission and Congress.

On November 2, 2020, Donald Trump, through Executive Order 13958, determined that the now-dissolved 1776 Commission shall "advise and offer recommendations to the President and the United States Semiquincentennial Commission regarding the Federal Government's plans to celebrate the 250th anniversary of American Independence and coordinate with relevant external stakeholders on their plans." Nevertheless, on the following January 20, the aforesaid Executive Order was rescinded by Joe Biden, through Executive Order 13985, on his first day in office.

Funding 
Under its 2016, original enabling legislation, "[a]ll expenditures of the Commission shall be made solely from donated funds," however, the 2020 amendments permitted that "[a]ll expenditures of the Commission shall be made from donations, earned income, and any funds made available."

The Office of Management and Budget's (OMB) PAYGO 2020 annual report details a net PAYGO impact of $0 even after its planned life course up until 2030. The OMB did not originally score the $8 million contribution under Public Law 116–260, labeling it "as a non-expenditure development transfer," regardless, they corrected the error afterwards.

For its work in the immediate four-year run-up to the Semiquincentennial, the Commission requested that their appropriations be almost doubled, from $8 million to $15 million. Per the proposed budget for fiscal year 2023:

In February 2022, it was reported that "[t]he commission [had] received some $12 million in federal appropriations so far, most of which it has turned over to the America250 Foundation," however, the following month, per Commissioner James L. Swanson, the amount ascended to "$20 million so far," probably due to the approval of an additional $8 million in the days following his statement.

According to an internal finance report, the Foundation was primarily funded by the Commission, which transferred $11.8 million of congressional appropriations, as of December 2021. The second-highest donor was catalogued as an unnamed "national sponsor" that contributed $2 million, which was later revealed to be Facebook, under a June 2021 agreement that provides for a total of $10 million to be paid in instalments.

Congress has designated the following amounts:

Controversies 
During the months of February and March 2022, through a series of Wall Street Journal exposés, the Commission, along with the America250 Foundation, were "accused...of a variety of misdeeds (including discrimination, which the foundation denies)," even though the Foundation had stated that in its presidential and CEO job opening that it was "committed to an inclusive environment where diverse thinking and opinions are shared in a supportive, team-oriented environment."

Sexism allegations 
In September 2021, both Anna Laymon, who had served as vice president of programs and planning, as well as Keri Potts, then-vice president of communications and publications, resigned. The former stated that, among "bouts of organizational instability and mismanagement," there were was also a lack of "women in any of the most important positions of power and influence at America250," with her appointment being "used as window dressing with each layer of higher level leadership positions being filled with men."

The following December, both Renee Burchard, then-chief administration officer and chief of staff, and Garlock, who had  served as the foundation's chief legal officer, resigned on the same day.

A letter that was sent to Burchard the following month was cause for an inquiry by the office of  Commissioner Bonnie Watson Coleman, one of two Democrat Representatives in the Commission. The day after being contacted by Rep. Watson Coleman's office, "Chairman...DiLella, who serves as chairman of both the commission and the foundation, emailed other leaders saying that "four former senior members raised certain concerns." He promised "a thorough, impartial investigation into the issues raised, to be conducted by a third-party." However, as of March 2022, chief communications officer Michael Frazier stated "that no one had yet been selected to conduct such an investigation."

Burchard's eleven-page resignation letter alleged that the Foundation's legal counsel had determined that Jesse Askew, vice president of branding and marketing, should have been terminated for submitting "fraudulent expense report and unauthorized invoices" totaling $30,000 of federally-appropriated money, which, nevertheless, had been subsequently approved. Since Askew is Black, then-interim Foundation president, Scott Hommel, determined that September to not fire him. Burchard reported that Hommel's decision boiled down to the public relations implications, and, that a soon-to-be employee who happened to be Black should fire Askew, as Hommel declared "when a black guy fires a black guy, then it's not that bad and would be viewed differently."

Askew alleged that Garlock had approved said invoices, however, she stated that "[a]s chief legal officer, I never had the authority to approve, ratify or sign contracts on behalf of the foundation. These agreements, if executed, were entered into over strong and continuous objections."

After the initial news report, three Commissioners, Senator Robert Casey, as well as Representatives Dwight Evans and Watson Coleman, wrote to DiLella, citing the article, as well as their concerns relating that the misuse of funds "or any discriminations in any way involved in their expenditure in unacceptable." In response, DiLella stated that they allegations were taken "seriously," they had knowledge of the complaints," there would be "plans to hire n outside firm to investigate the allegations," and that he believed that the ensuing results of the investing would entirely vindicate the Commission.

On February 25, the four former executives filed a lawsuit in the United States District Court for the District of Columbia against the Commission, the Foundation, and the America Battlefield Trust, "alleging mismanagement and discrimination drove them from their jobs." The suit also  alleges that both the Commission and the Trust failed in their oversight roles of the Foundation, with accusing leadership of "cronyism, self-dealing, mismanagement of funds, potentially unlawful contracting practices and wasteful spending." In addition, it states that DiLella had repeatedly named associates of him to positions of importance, some of the appointments starting off on a voluntary basis and then being transferred to being compensated, a practice, which, in turn created "a 'boys club,' freezing out the women who were given titles and large responsibilities, but no authority or input into key decisions of the foundation," since, "[f]rom the creation of the Foundation until December 2021, only four women served in executive leadership roles," who, coincidentally, were the four plaintiffs.

The requested redress are lost wages, as well as "a Court-mandated full forensic investigation of the Foundation and Commission with respect to pay practices, employment policies and financial transactions and contracts." By March 7, Frazier publicly expressed his and DiLella's hopes of commencing a review in the following 30 days.

Facebook 
In March 2022, the Foundation entered into an agreement with Meta Platforms, "giving Facebook's parent an inside role in producing and promoting the Semiquincentennial commemoration in exchange for $10 million." The agreement, which was approved by Chairman DiLella, was criticized for providing Facebook with "too much influence," as well as privileges that might discourage other potential sponsors. Per Commissioner Andrew Hohns, the Commission's rules require that all "contracts that include the use of the commission's...identity" need prior approval by the Commission, nonetheless, none had been, nor had the details of the Facebook contract been made known to the whole of the Commission.

Meta had been "reviewing its association" after the resignation and discrimination reports were made public, nonetheless, they went ahead, becoming America250's exclusive "social connectivity partner, helping "to plan and present the commemorations," as well as appointing Meta CEO Mark Zuckerberg to its advisory Corporate Leader Council. Furthermore, America250 will support Facebook's Occulus VR in their pursuit to fly drones over federal property "to catalog National Parks and Landmarks," requesting the organization to coordinate meetings between the company and Department Interior staff, as well as "outsourcing some Semiquincentennial observances to Meta."

The deal, which was brokered by 21 Sports and Entertainment Marketing Group Inc. and entitled to a 17% commission, was considered by Anna Laymon, then-vice president of programs and planning, in a recording as "seems...to give Facebook special access to a federal agency," while Rob Prazmark, an officer of the aforementioned broker, revealed that it "had been approved by Thomas McGarrigle, a friend of Mr. DiLella who is serving as the foundation's counsel."

At a September 2021 executive meeting, Renee Burchard, a former-employee like Laymon, "warned that Facebook's involvement could be a deal breaker for other companies," when discussing strategies to lure in other potential corporate sponsors such as Walmart, which has allegedly declined sponsorship invitations.

Centralisation 
As was expected, on Wednesday, March 9, 2022, in a closed-door meeting, the Commission voted to increase DiLella's power, in response to a meeting the previous September where "three members challenged [his] leadership," which was catalogued as "a lack of decorum and respect for fellow Commissioners." These "dissenting commissioners" charged DiLella with "improperly transferring the body's functions and federal appropriations to the private America250 Foundation, which he and his allies control."

Commissioner Frazier had stated that "[t]he Governance Committee spent more than 100 hours, including 14 hours in meetings deliberating on comments and suggestions." Some of the changes, which were approved by a 12-10 margin in a Zoom meeting where it was "proceeded to a vote without debate," included "[giving] DiLella a stronger control over the commission, with power to appoint officers and committee members, limit commissioners' participation in meetings and withhold information from both the public and other commissioners," in tune with DiLella's allege wish that the federal agency "operate more like a business."

In addition, the Commission endorsed DiLella's actions during the previous years that hadn't received Commission authorization by giving blanket approval. For his part, Joseph Crowley, who had served as a Representative in the Commission, and afterwards as a private citizen, had previously declared that he was "not comfortable with rubber stamping everything that has been done over the past three years." On the March 9 meeting, Crowley, who decried it as "very authoritarian and not at all in the Spirit of '76," and Representatives Robert Aderholt and Bonnie Watson Coleman, the lattermost of whom held up a sign that read "I Demand to Be Heard," all requested to speak and were ignored by DiLella.

List of Commissioners of the United States Semiquincentennial

See also 

 Abraham Lincoln Bicentennial Commission
 United States Semiquincentennial

Notes

References

External links 

 List of current Commissioners
 Discrimination lawsuit against America250 on Justia

2016 establishments in the United States
2026 in the United States
Organizations based in Washington, D.C.
United States Declaration of Independence anniversaries
United States national commissions
United States Semiquincentennial